Göte Olsson (7 September 1930 to 17 March 1998) was an international speedway rider from Sweden.

Speedway career 
Born in Kumla, Olsson was one of speedway's leading riders during the 1950s. He was the champion of Sweden, winning the Swedish Championship in 1952 at the age of 22. A  memorial race is held in his memory.

References 

1930 births
1998 deaths
Swedish speedway riders